The Deputy Chief of Staff for Strategic Deterrence and Nuclear Integration is a position in the United States Air Force tasked with the direction, guidance, integration, and advocacy regarding the nuclear deterrence mission of the U.S. Air Force and engages with joint and interagency partners for nuclear enterprise solutions. Commonly referred to as the A10, it is held by a lieutenant general. The position is one of ten senior positions in the Headquarters of the U.S. Air Force. As such, the officeholder of this position serves in the Air Staff. The current holder of this position is Lieutenant General James C. Dawkins. The corporation SAIC currently provides strategic planning and policy support for A10 across Washington, D.C., Joint Base Pearl Harbor-Hickam, and Ramstein Air Base.

List of Deputy Chiefs of Staff for Strategic Deterrence and Nuclear Integration of the United States Air Force

References

See also 
 Air Staff
 United States Air Force

United States Air Force generals